The December 2021 Christian Democratic Union leadership election was held in December 2021. The leader of the party was elected indirectly by a party convention, for the first time the CDU held a vote by the membership to decide the candidate which the party's executive board proposed to the party convention. Though the convention is not obliged to elect the proposed candidates, the membership vote is considered politically binding. The online vote of members was from 4 December to 16 December 2021 and the convention in Hanover on 21 and 22 January 2022 formalised the election.

The election was triggered by the resignation of leader Armin Laschet in October 2021. Laschet was elected in January 2021 after the resignation of Annegret Kramp-Karrenbauer. His resignation was triggered by the loss of the 2021 German federal election.

Three candidates ran, being former Leader of the CDU/CSU in the Bundestag Friedrich Merz, former Minister for the Environment Norbert Röttgen and Head of the Chancellery Helge Braun. Braun was seen as the establishment candidate, being a longtime associate of Merkel. Röttgen, who was fired as Minister by Merkel in 2012, did not have the establishment backing, but ran on a liberal platform and appealing to young voters via social media. Merz was the conservative outsider, being shunned by Merkel for the chairmanship of the CDU/CSU in the Bundestag.

Party members overwhelmingly choose conservative outsider Friedrich Merz in December 2021 with 62.1%, avoiding a runoff election, after he had failed in the previous two leadership elections, to Annegret Kramp-Karrenbauer in 2018 and Laschet in January 2021. This was seen as a rebuttal to the party establishment, that had backed Kramp-Karrenbauer and Laschet, both seen as being more moderate, aligned in both policy positions and leadership style to Angela Merkel.

Candidates

Endorsements

Polls among CDU voters

Results

References 

2021 elections in Germany
Leadership election, 2021
Political party leadership elections in Germany
Christian Democratic Union of Germany leadership election